Bavay may refer to:

People
 Arthur René Jean Baptiste Bavay (1840-1923), French pharmacist, herpetologist and malacologist. 
 Laurent Bavay (born 1972), is a Belgian Egyptologist.

Other
 Bavay, a French commune.
 Bavay (surname)
 Louvignies-Bavay, a former commune in the Nord department in northern France.
 Houdain-lez-Bavay, a commune in the Nord department in northern France.